Carolina Shores is a town in Brunswick County, North Carolina, United States. The population was 3,048 at the 2010 census, up from 1,482 in  2000. It is part of the Myrtle Beach metropolitan area.

The town was incorporated in 1998 after a split from the town of Calabash, which came as the result of years of disagreement over "sewer, garbage collection and sign restrictions". The town limits of Carolina Shores currently interlock with those of Calabash. Sharing the name of the local country club, "Carolina Shores" could be considered a misnomer since the town does not have a "shore" with any large body of water.

Geography
Carolina Shores is located in southwestern Brunswick County at  (33.899163, -78.578070). Its southwestern border is the South Carolina state line; the town of Calabash borders Carolina Shores to the south.

Demographics

2020 census

As of the 2020 United States census, there were 4,588 people, 1,882 households, and 1,319 families residing in the town.

2000 census
As of the census of 2000, there were 1,482 people, 766 households, and 593 families residing in the town. The population density was 1,073.8 people per square mile (414.6/km2). There were 838 housing units at an average density of 607.2 per square mile (234.5/km2). The racial makeup of the town was 99.33% White, 0.40% African American, 0.27% from other races. Hispanic or Latino of any race were 0.54% of the population.

There were 766 households, out of which 4.0% had children under the age of 18 living with them, 74.5% were married couples living together, 2.0% had a female householder with no husband present, and 22.5% were non-families. 20.5% of all households were made up of individuals, and 14.9% had someone living alone who was 65 years of age or older. The average household size was 1.93 and the average family size was 2.17.

In the town, the population was spread out, with 3.9% under the age of 18, 1.6% from 18 to 24, 6.0% from 25 to 44, 29.4% from 45 to 64, and 59.1% who were 65 years of age or older. The median age was 68 years. For every 100 females, there were 90.7 males. For every 100 females age 18 and over, there were 88.1 males.

The median income for a household in the town was $43,933, and the median income for a family was $48,527. Males had a median income of $34,167 versus $24,250 for females. The per capita income for the town was $27,093. About 2.8% of families and 4.9% of the population were below the poverty line, including 18.8% of those under age 18 and 1.2% of those age 65 or over.

References

External links
 Town of Carolina Shores official website

Towns in North Carolina
Towns in Brunswick County, North Carolina
Cape Fear (region)
Populated places established in 1998